Kliment Taseski (born 27 May 1991) is an Australian footballer who last played for Green Gully SC in the National Premier Leagues Victoria.

Early life
Taseski was born in Melbourne, and is the son of Macedonian former footballer Ilija Taseski,  who played in the National Soccer League between 1985 and 1989. Before beginning his senior career, Taseski played junior football at Noble Park, and also had short stints at VIS and South Melbourne.

Club career
Taseski began his senior career with the Victorian Premier League club Altona Magic. He played a pivotal role in their side in the 2009 season, helping them to claim the championship and was awarded man of the match in the grand final.

After the 2009 VPL season, he signed with the Melbourne Victory as part of their youth squad, and made seven appearances in total in the 2009–10 season.  He returned to Altona Magic for the 2010 VPL season, but shortly after the season started, he was signed by new A-League club Melbourne Heart. He made his debut in a pre-season friendly against Premier League club Everton, which the Heart lost 2–0.

He made his A-League debut on 29 August with the Melbourne Heart, coming on as a substitute against Perth Glory. Taseski made his return to the VPL at the completion of the 2010–11 A-League season, as he and fellow Heart player Kamal Ibrahim were loaned out to South Melbourne by the Heart. He scored on his début at South Melbourne, helping his side to a 6–4 win over Springvale. On 6 April 2012, it was announced that he would be leaving Melbourne Heart. After spending the remainder of Season 2012 with Moreland Zebras he signed with Victorian Premier League team Richmond Eagles for the 2013 season. After impressing with Richmond despite the club's relegation, he earned himself a move to NPL Victoria club Hume City FC for the 2014 season.

Taseski signed a 1-year contract with Swedish 2nd division club FC Rosengård 1917 midway through 2015, but departed after just six months, returning to Victoria to sign for the Arthur Papas-led Green Gully SC.

International career
Taseski played for the Australian Under 20s during the qualification for the 2010 AFF U-19 Youth Championship. He played 3 times and scored a double against Cambodia in their 3–0 win.

Honours

Club
with Altona Magic
 Victorian Premier League (1): 2009

with Australia'''
 AFF U-19 Youth Championship: 2010

Individual
 Jimmy Rooney Medal for VPL Grand Final Man of the Match: 2009
 Victorian Premier League Young Player of the Year Award: 2012

References

External links

1991 births
Living people
Melbourne Victory FC players
Melbourne City FC players
A-League Men players
Victorian Institute of Sport alumni
FC Rosengård 1917 players
Soccer players from Melbourne
Australian people of Macedonian descent
Association football midfielders
Australian soccer players
Expatriate footballers in Sweden
Australian expatriate soccer players
Australian expatriate sportspeople in Sweden